Vulcacius Rufinus (died 368) was a Roman politician, related to the Constantinian dynasty.

Biography 

A pagan, Rufinus was the brother of Neratius Cerealis, Galla (the mother of Constantius Gallus), and the mother of Maximus. He was pontifex maximus, consularis for Numidia, comes ordinis primi intra consistorium under the Emperor Constans I or his brother Constantius II, comes per Orientem, Aegypti et Mesopotamiae per easdem vice sacra iudicans from 5 April 342, praetorian prefect of Italy from 344 to 347 (between the prefectures of Fulvius Placidus and Ulpius Limenius), consul ordinarius prior in 347 with Flavius Eusebius, praetorian prefect of Illyricum between 347 and 352.

While he was prefect, he was sent as an envoy by the usurper Magnentius, who had ousted Constans, to Constantius II, along with Marcellinus, Maximus and Nunechius. Rufinus was not arrested, unlike his companions, and kept the prefecture of Illyricum under Constantius. In 354, after the fall of Magnentius, he was praetorian prefect of Gaul, living in the capital Trier, but was replaced by Gaius Ceionius Rufius Volusianus Lampadius. Rufinus may have lost his post because his relative Constantius Gallus had fallen into disgrace with the Emperor.

Between 365 and 368 he was the praetorian prefect for Italy and Africa, succeeding Claudius Mamertinus and of Gaul from 366 to 368. He died in service.

Bibliography 

 John Morris, Arnold Hugh Martin Jones, John Robert Martindale, The Prosopography of the later Roman Empire, Cambridge University Press, 1992. pp. 782–783 

368 deaths
4th-century Romans
Ancient Roman governors
Imperial Roman consuls
Praetorian prefects of Gaul
Praetorian prefects of the Illyricum
Praetorian prefects of Italy
Rufinus
Year of birth unknown